Giuseppe Cammarano (4 June 1766 – 8 October 1850) was an Italian painter and leader of the Academy of Arts in his birthplace of Sciacca, Sicily.

Biography
Cammarano began his work at the Royal court of Naples. He painted frescos, now degraded, in the Reggia di Carditello, inspired by work of Fedele Fischetti and Domenico Chelli. He found a patron in Ferdinand I of the Two Sicilies, who funded his study to Rome, where he developed a style with both Rococo and Neoclassic tendencies. He labored in the restoration of paintings in Naples, many of which had been damaged by the Napoleonic invasion. He became professor at the Reale Accademia di Belle Arti and entrusted with the decorations of the Royal Palace of Caserta: his most important fresco is Minerva awarding prizes to Arts and Sciences (1814) on the Ceiling of the Council Hall.  Among his fellow teachers was Tito Angelini.

Again in the Reggia of Carditello, he painted Hector reproves Paris (1814). In the bedrooms, he painted the Victory of Theusus over the Minotaur (1824). He participated in the fresco decoration of the Royal Palace of Naples. He painted a Last Supper for the Cathedral of Caserta.

His father was an actor for the San Carlo Theater of Naples. Giuseppe painted the ceiling fresco in the auditorium of the theater, above the seats, representing Apollo introduces the poets.  His son, Salvadore Cammarano, was an opera librettist and his grandson, Michele Cammarano was also a painter.  He died in Naples, aged 84.

Sources
Antonio Canino, Campania, Touring Club Italiano
Francesco I of Bourbon and Family

1766 births
1850 deaths
People from Sciacca
18th-century Italian painters
Italian male painters
19th-century Italian painters
Painters from Naples
Italian neoclassical painters
Fresco painters
Academic staff of the Accademia di Belle Arti di Napoli
19th-century Italian male artists
18th-century Italian male artists